The Love Bug is a 1968 American sports adventure comedy film directed by Robert Stevenson from a screenplay by Bill Walsh and Don DaGradi, based on the story "Car, Boy, Girl" by Gordon Buford. The film is the first installment in the Herbie film series.

The film follows the adventures of the Volkswagen Beetle Herbie, Herbie's driver, Jim Douglas (Dean Jones), and Jim's love interest, Carole Bennett (Michele Lee). It also features Buddy Hackett as Jim's enlightened, kind-hearted friend, Tennessee Steinmetz, a character who creates "art" from used car parts. English actor David Tomlinson portrays the villainous Peter Thorndyke, the owner of an auto showroom and an SCCA national champion who sells Herbie to Jim and eventually becomes his racing rival.

The Love Bug was followed by Herbie Rides Again (1974).

Plot

Race car driver Jim Douglas has been reduced to competing in demolition derby races against drivers half his age. Jim lives in an old fire house overlooking San Francisco Bay with his friend Tennessee Steinmetz, a claimant of Buddhist spiritual enlightenment, who is a mechanic and sculptor who uses old car parts. At an upmarket European car showroom, Jim meets sales assistant Carole Bennett, and the dealership's British owner, Peter Thorndyke, who abuses a white Volkswagen Beetle which had been returned to the showroom that morning. Jim, lacking money, leaves Thorndyke's showroom, but the Beetle follows him home. After a police run-in on charges of grand theft, Jim agrees to lease-purchase the little car.

At first, Jim does not take kindly to the Beetle's reluctance to take the freeway and later pairing him with Carole, and suspects Thorndyke has conned him with a faulty car. Tennessee, however, believes the car has a mind of its own, and befriends it, naming it "Herbie". 

Jim prepares Herbie for racing, and to the astonishment of  Thorndyke, Herbie wins his first race. Jim and Herbie then defeat Thorndyke himself in a race at Riverside Raceway, giving Jim full ownership of Herbie, and go on a winning streak, leaving Thorndyke frustrated as to how Jim and Herbie are achieving their success. Thorndyke infiltrates Tennessee's garage the night before their next race whilst Jim and Carol are on a date, and sabotages Herbie by pouring Irish coffee into the gas tank, causing Herbie to fail to finish the race the following day. A disgusted Jim, with his eyes now on the upcoming El Dorado road race, decides to switch out Herbie for a brand new Lamborghini 400GT, much to Carole (who quit her job in Thorndyke's showroom in protest) and Tennessee's anger. Jealous, Herbie damages the Lamborghini and runs away. 

Jim, finally realising that Herbie is alive, follows Herbie's trail of damage through the city. He finds Herbie trying to throwing himself off the Golden Gate Bridge. Jim risks his life to stop Herbie, and they make amends. Tang Wu (Benson Fong), a Chinese-American businessman whose store has been damaged by Herbie, offers to drop the charges in exchange for ownership of Herbie. Jim and Tennessee agree, provided they drive Herbie in the El Dorado and Wu has to sell Herbie back should they win.

The El Dorado, a two-day, out-and-back open road race, runs through the Sierra Nevada mountains from Yosemite Valley to Virginia City and back. On the first leg, Thorndyke and his co-driver Havershaw carry out a series of dirty tricks against Herbie. As a result of Thorndyke's shenanigans, Jim (with Carole and Tennessee as co-drivers) limps home last with Herbie missing two wheels and having to use a wagon wheel to get to the line. During overnight repairs, Herbie refuses to restart, and Wu reveals that he also made a agreement with Thorndyke over ownership of Herbie should they lose. After Thorndyke attempts to tow Herbie away and assaults Jim, Herbie restarts, chasing Thorndyke off. 

The following day, Herbie starts the second leg last, but thanks to some ingenious shortcuts, they are able to make up for lost time. Approaching the finish, Herbie succumbs to metal fatigue and breaks in two, his back half (carrying Tennessee and the engine) crossing the line just ahead of Thorndyke, while the front (carrying Jim and Carole) rolls over the line just behind, meaning Herbie takes both first and third places.

Wu takes over Thorndyke's car dealership, hires Tennessee as his assistant and demotes Thorndyke and Havershaw to the mechanics' shop. Rewelded back into shape, Herbie chauffeurs the newlywed Jim and Carole away on their honeymoon.

Cast

Dean Jones as James "Jim" Douglas, a racing driver
Michele Lee as Carole Bennet, a mechanic and Jim's love interest
David Tomlinson as Peter Thorndyke, the owner of the car shop 
Buddy Hackett as Tennessee Steinmetz, Jim's friend and roommate and partner in racing
Joe Flynn as Havershaw, Thorndyke's right-hand man
Benson Fong as Tang Wu, Jim's friend and team supporter
Joe E. Ross as Detective
Barry Kelley as Police sergeant
Iris Adrian as Carhop
Gary Owens as Announcer
Chick Hearn as Announcer 
Andy Granatelli as Association President
Ned Glass as Toll Booth Attendant
Robert Foulk as Bice
Gil Lamb as Policeman at Park
Nicole Jaffe as Girl in Dune-Buggy
Wally Boag as Flabbergasted Driver
Russ Caldwell as Boy Driving Dune-Buggy
Peter Renaday as Policeman on Bridge
Brian Fong as Chinese carrying Herbie
Pedro Gonzalez Gonzalez as Mexican Driver
Dale Van Sickel as Driver

Production notes

Story and development
Dean Jones credited the film's success to the fact that it was the last live-action film produced by Walt Disney Productions under Walt Disney's involvement, released just two years after his death in 1966. Although Jones tried to pitch him a serious, straightforward film project concerning the story of the first sports car ever brought to the United States, Walt suggested a different car story for him, which was "Car, Boy, Girl", a story written in 1961 by Gordon Buford.

Car, Boy, Girl; The Magic Volksy; The Runaway Wagen; Beetlebomb; Wonderbeetle; Bugboom and Thunderbug were among the original development titles considered for the film before the title was finalized as The Love Bug.

Herbie competes in the Monterey Grand Prix, which, except for 1963, was not a sports car race. The actual sports car race held at Monterey was the Monterey Sports Car Championships. The 1968 Monterey Grand Prix was in fact a Can Am Series race and did not feature production cars.

Peter Thorndyke's yellow "Special" is actually a 1965 Apollo GT, a rare sports car sold by International Motorcars of Oakland, California. It used an Italian-built body and chassis from Intermeccanica paired with a small-block Buick V8 engine that was installed in Oakland. This car exists today, is in the hands of a private collector, and has been restored as it was seen in the film with its yellow paint and number 14 logo.

"Herbie"

Before the film entered production, the titular car was not specified as a Volkswagen Beetle, and Disney set up a casting call for a dozen cars to audition. In the lineup, there were a few Toyotas, a TVR, a handful of Volvos, an MG and a pearl white Volkswagen Beetle. The Volkswagen Beetle was chosen as it was the only one that elicited the crew to reach out and pet it.

The Volkswagen brand name, logo or shield does not feature anywhere in the film, as the automaker did not permit Disney to use the name. The only logos can be briefly seen in at least two places, however. The first instance is on the brake pedals during the first scene where Herbie takes control with Jim inside (on the freeway when Herbie runs into Thorndyke's Rolls-Royce), and it is shown in all the future scenes when Jim is braking. The second instance is on the ignition key, when Jim tries to shut down the braking Herbie. The later sequels produced, however, do promote the Volkswagen name (as sales of the Beetle were down when the sequels were produced). The VW "Wolfsburg" castle emblem on the steering wheel hub is also seen throughout the car's interior shots. Within the script, the car was only ever referred to as "Herbie", "the small car" or "the Bug"—the latter, although a common nickname for the Beetle, was not trademarked by Volkswagen at the time of filming.

The car was later given the name "Herbie" from one of Buddy Hackett's skits about a ski instructor named Klaus, who speaks with a German accent as he introduces his fellow ski instructors, who are named Hans, Fritz, Wilhelm, and Sandor. At the end of the skit, Hackett would say "If you ain't got a Herbie (pronounced "hoy-bee), I ain't going."

Herbie's trademark "53" racing number was chosen by producer Bill Walsh, who was a fan of Los Angeles Dodgers baseball player Don Drysdale (Drysdale's jersey number, later retired by the team, was 53).

Walsh also gave Herbie his trademark red, white and blue racing stripes presumably for the more patriotic color and came up with the film's gags such as Herbie squirting oil and opening the doors by himself.

Benson Fong, who played Mr. Wu, said that when he and the others were dragged along the dirt by Herbie, it was like being pulled by 40 horses.

Herbie has his own cast billing in the closing credits, the only time this was done in the entire series of films.

Today, only a handful of the original Herbie cars are known to exist. Car #10 was recovered from a warehouse in Pennsylvania and has been preserved—still sporting its original paint from the film.

Deleted scenes
The bonuses on the DVD provide two deleted scenes named "Used Car Lot" and "Playground".

A scene shot, but not included in the final cut of the film, featured Jim calling at a used car lot prior to his visiting Thorndyke's auto showroom. This missing sequence has long since been lost, and all that remains is the script and a single black-and-white photograph of Jim talking with the salesman at the lot.

An unfilmed scene at the end of the story that was scripted and storyboarded was to have shown Herbie playing with children at a nearby playground prior to taking the newly married Jim and Carole off on their honeymoon.

Stock footage
The opening scene of the demolition derby cars is footage from the film Fireball 500. Parts of this scene can also be found in a 1966-model year dealer promotional film by Chevrolet, titled Impact '66.

Shooting locations
Some of the racetrack scenes were shot at the Riverside International Raceway in Riverside, California. Others were filmed at Laguna Seca Raceway in Monterey, California, Willow Springs Raceway in Willow Springs, California and Paramount Ranch in Agoura Hills, California. Additional scenes depicting the El Dorado race were filmed near the San Bernardino Mountains in Big Bear City, California.

Cast and crew
Andy Granatelli, who was popular at the time as a presence at the Indianapolis 500 as well as the spokesman for STP, appears as himself as the racing association president. Announcer Gary Owens (of Rowan & Martin's Laugh-In fame) and Los Angeles Lakers play-by-play man Chick Hearn also appear as themselves. The driving scenes were choreographed by veteran stunt man Carey Loftin.

Drivers in the film billed in the opening credits include Dale Van Sickel, Reg Parton, Regina Parton, Tom Bamford, Bob Drake, Marion J. Playan, Hall Brock, Bill Hickman, Rex Ramsay, Hal Grist, Lynn Grate, Larry Schmitz, Richard Warlock, Dana Derfus, Everett Creach, Gerald Jann, Bill Couch, Ted Duncan, Robert Hoys, Gene Roscoe, Jack Mahoney, Charles Willis, Richard Brill, Roy Butterfield, Rudy Doucette, J.J. Wilson, Jim McCullough, Bud Ekins, Glenn Wilder, Gene Curtis, Robert James, John Timanus, Bob Harris, Fred Krone, Richard Ceary, Jesse Wayne, Jack Perkins, Fred Stromsoe, Ronnie Rondell, and Kim Brewer.

Cars featured

1956 Ferrari 250 GT Berlinetta (#14)
1955 OSCA MT4 Barchetta (#18)
1957 Chevrolet Two-Ten 2-Door Sedan (#23)
1959 Devin D (#47)
1959 Austin-Healey 3000 (#64)
195x Kellison J4 (#82)
1960 Ferrari 250 GT Berlinetta SWB (#54)
1963 Apollo 3500 GT (#14)
1963 Shelby Cobra 289 (#20)
1963 Triumph Spitfire 4 (#96)
1964 Jaguar XK-E (#14)
1965 Chevrolet Corvette Sting Ray C2 (#29)
1961 Balchowsky Ol' Yaller MkIV (#41)
1966 Lamborghini 400 GT 2+2
1966 Chevrolet Corvette Sting Ray C2 (#20)

Promotion
During one scene in the film, Herbie has lost one of his wheels, and Tennessee is hanging out of the passenger side door to balance him. The door opens, and there is no "53" logo on the door. This image was used heavily to promote the film.

Reception
The Love Bug was the second-highest-grossing film of 1969, earning over $51.2 million at the domestic box office. It received mostly positive reviews from critics, later earning a 78% "Fresh" rating from 18 critics on the review aggregator website Rotten Tomatoes.

Vincent Canby of The New York Times panned the film as "a long, sentimental Volkswagen commercial ... which has the form of fantasy-comedy, lots of not-very-special effects and no real humor."

Variety wrote, "For sheer inventiveness of situation and the charm that such an idea projects, 'The Love Bug' rates as one of the better entries of the Disney organization."

Charles Champlin of the Los Angeles Times called it
brisk, active, bright, technically impeccable, simple-minded, full of tricky effects and free of all but the most glancing resemblances to nasty old reality. It is a formula picture, and such troubles as there are arise mainly from the fact that the formula has known much stronger ingredients (Fred MacMurray and flubber, let's say) in the past.
The Monthly Film Bulletin declared that "this very engaging mechanical fantasy is the best piece of work from the Disney studios for some time. The caper appears to have had the effect of injecting life into Robert Stevenson's usually pedestrian style, since with the exception of one glutinously sentimental episode the pace never lets up."

Comic book adaptation
 Gold Key: The Love Bug (June 1969)

Legacy
Four theatrical sequels followed: Herbie Rides Again, Herbie Goes to Monte Carlo, Herbie Goes Bananas, and Herbie: Fully Loaded. Some parts of the racing sequences from the film were later reused for Herbie's dream sequence in Herbie Rides Again, responding to Grandma Steinmetz's telling Willoughby Whitfield that Herbie used to be a famous racecar.

A five-episode television series, titled Herbie, the Love Bug, aired on CBS in the United States in 1982. Directed by Vincent McEveety, the series acted as a continuation of the films, with Dean Jones reprising his role as Jim Douglas. In 1997, there was a made-for-television sequel which included a Dean Jones cameo, tying it to the previous films. The most recent sequel, Herbie: Fully Loaded, was released on June 22, 2005, by Walt Disney Pictures.

At Disney's All-Star Movies Resort at Walt Disney World in Orlando, Florida, Herbie has been immortalized in the "Love Bug" buildings 6 and 7.

Home media
The film was released on VHS on March 4, 1980. It was re-released on November 6, 1985, September 11, 1991 and on October 28, 1994 with Herbie Rides Again. It was soon re-released again on September 16, 1997 along with the entire Herbie the Love Bug film series. It was released on DVD for the first time on May 20, 2003. It was released again with its sequels in a four movie collection in 2012. A 45th Anniversary Edition Blu-ray Disc was released on December 16, 2014 as a Disney Movie Club exclusive title.

See also
 Superbug (1971–1978)—a knockoff series of West German films also about a sentient Volkswagen Beetle named Dudu.
 Christine (1983)—a later supernatural horror film about an anthropomorphic autumn-red, hardtop 1958 Plymouth Fury named Christine.

References

External links

Lovebugfans forum

Lovebugfans (archived)

San Francisco in Cinema: The Love Bug

1968 films
1960s fantasy comedy films
1968 romantic comedy films
American fantasy comedy films
American romantic comedy films
1
Films based on short fiction
Films set in San Francisco
Films shot in San Francisco
Films directed by Robert Stevenson
Films produced by Bill Walsh (producer)
Films adapted into comics
Films scored by George Bruns
Walt Disney Pictures films
1960s English-language films
1960s American films
English-language comedy films